St Alphege Church is a grade II listed church in Edmonton, London. It was designed by Edward Maufe in a modern Swedish Gothic style and opened in the 1950s.

References

External links 

Churches in the London Borough of Enfield
Grade II listed churches in London
Grade II listed buildings in the London Borough of Enfield